Mount Bulyea is located in Banff National Park on the border of Alberta and British Columbia. It was named in 1920 after Hon. George H. V. Bulyea, a Canadian Pacific Railway employee and first Lieutenant General of Alberta.

See also
 List of peaks on the British Columbia–Alberta border
 List of mountains in the Canadian Rockies

References

Notes

Three-thousanders of Alberta
Three-thousanders of British Columbia
Canadian Rockies
Mountains of Banff National Park